The women's 1500 meter at the 2018 KNSB Dutch Single Distance Championships took place in Heerenveen at the Thialf ice skating rink on Saturday 28 October 2017. Although this tournament was held in 2017, it was part of the 2017–2018 speed skating season.

There were 24 participants.

Title holder was Ireen Wüst.

Result

Source:

References

Single Distance Championships
2018 Single Distance
World